Rodrigo Pinheiro Ferreira (born 28 August 2002) is a Portuguese professional footballer who plays for FC Porto B as a defender.

Football career
He made his LigaPro debut for Porto B on 11 August 2019 in a game against Sporting Covilhã.

References

External links

2002 births
Living people
Sportspeople from Guimarães
Portuguese footballers
Association football defenders
Liga Portugal 2 players
FC Porto B players